Raghupriya (meaning The one dear to Raghu) is a ragam in Carnatic music (musical scale of South Indian classical music). It is the 42nd melakarta rāgam (parent scale) in the 72 melakarta rāgam system of Carnatic music. It is called Ravikriya in Muthuswami Dikshitar school of Carnatic music.

Structure and Lakshana

It is the 6th rāgam in the 7th chakra Rishi. The mnemonic name is Rishi-Sha. The mnemonic phrase is sa ra ga mi pa dhu nu. Its  structure (ascending and descending scale) is as follows (see swaras in Carnatic music for details on below notation and terms):
: 
: 
(the notes shuddha rishabham, shuddha gandharam, prati madhyamam, shatsruthi dhaivatham, kakali nishadham are used in this scale)

As it is a melakarta rāgam, by definition it is a sampoorna rāgam (has all seven notes in ascending and descending scale). It is the prati madhyamam equivalent of Tanaroopi, which is the 6th melakarta scale.

Janya rāgams 
Raghupriya has a few minor janya rāgams (derived scales) associated with it. See List of janya Rāgams for full list of scales associated with Raghupriya.

Compositions
A few compositions set to the scale Raghupriya are:

Khalitaka vamsa by Dr. M. Balamuralikrishna
Himagiri kumari by Muthuswami Dikshitar
Sadananda by Koteeswara Iyer

Related rāgams
This section covers the theoretical and scientific aspect of this rāgam.

Raghupriya's notes when shifted using Graha bhedam, yields no other melakarta rāgam, like all 6 rāgams in the Rishi chakra (Salagam, Jalarnavam, Jhalavarali, Navaneetam and Pavani being the other 5). Only these rāgams have a gap of 3 notes anywhere in their scale, between G1 to M2. Such a gap does not occur in any other melakarta by definition. Graha bhedam is the step taken in keeping the relative note frequencies same, while shifting the shadjam to the next note in the rāgam.

Notes

References

Melakarta ragas